The 1970 U.S. Pro Tennis Championships was a men's tennis tournament played on outdoor hard courts at the Longwood Cricket Club in Chestnut Hill, Massachusetts, USA. It was classified as a Class 1 category tournament and was part of the 1970 Grand Prix circuit. It was the 43rd edition of the tournament and was held from August 3 through August 9, 1970. Fourth-seeded Tony Roche won the singles title and the accompanying $12,000 first prize money.

Finals

Singles

 Tony Roche defeated  Rod Laver, 3–6, 6–4, 1–6, 6–2, 6–2.

Doubles

 Roy Emerson /  Rod Laver defeated  Ismail El Shafei /  Torben Ulrich, 6–1, 7–6.

References

External links
 International Tennis Federation (ITF) – tournament edition details
 Longwood Cricket Club – list of U.S. Pro Champions

U.S. Pro Tennis Championships
U.S. Pro Championships
U.S. Pro Championships
U.S. Pro Tennis Championships
U.S. Pro Tennis Championships
Chestnut Hill, Massachusetts
History of Middlesex County, Massachusetts
Sports in Middlesex County, Massachusetts
Tennis tournaments in Massachusetts
Tourist attractions in Middlesex County, Massachusetts